Mário João Laginha dos Santos, OIH (born April 25, 1960, in Lisbon), a pianist and composer, is one of the most well-known Portuguese jazz musicians today. He is mostly recognized for his collaborations with Portuguese jazz singer Maria João, with whom he recorded over a dozen albums and toured worldwide extensively. Other acknowledged collaboration work includes four-handed piano sessions with Bernardo Sassetti and Pedro Burmester.

Mário's main influence on piano is Keith Jarrett.

Discography

His first solo record, "Canções e Fugas", went on sale in March 2006.

Previous recordings (most recent appear on top):
 Setembro (2017) (with Julian Argüelles and Helge Andreas Norbakken)
Grândolas – Seis Canções e Dois Pianos nos Trinta Anos de Abril (2014) (with Bernardo Sassetti)
Terra Seca (2013)
Mongrel (2010)
Chocolate (*) (2008)
Espaço (2007)
 Tralha (*) (2004)
 Mário Laginha e Bernardo Sassetti (2003) (with Bernardo Sassetti)
 Undercovers (*) (2002)
 Mumadji (live) (*) (2001)
 Chorinho Feliz (*) (2000)
 Lobos, Raposas e Coiotes (*) (1999)
 Cor (*) (1998)
 Fábula (*) (1996)
 Danças (*) (1994)
 Duetos (1994)
 Hoje (1994)
Sol (Cal Viva) (*) (1991)
 Cem Caminhos (1985)
 Quinteto Maria João (*) (1983)
 Ao Encontro (Sexteto de Jazz de Lisboa)

(*) – with Maria João

External links
 MarioLaginha.org
 Maria João e Mário Laginha Performing Live

1960 births
Living people
Portuguese jazz pianists
21st-century pianists
Edition Records artists